Michael Curley (15 May 1912 – 1973) was an English footballer who played for Northwich Victoria, Manchester City, Port Vale, Colwyn Bay, and Macclesfield Town in the 1930s.

Career
Curley played for Northwich Victoria and Manchester City, before joining Port Vale in May 1935. He played 24 Second Division and three FA Cup games in the 1935–36 season, and scored one goal in a 2–1 victory over Charlton Athletic at The Old Recreation Ground on 16 September. The "Valiants" were relegated and Curley fell out of the first team picture, featuring in just three Third Division North games in the 1936–37 season. He transferred to Colwyn Bay in November 1936, and later moved on to Macclesfield Town but only featured in the opening two games of 1937–38 Cheshire County League season and after spending time in the reserves he returned to Northwich Victoria. Between 1937 and 1940 he played 64 games for Mossley.

Career statistics
Source:

References

Sportspeople from Northwich
English footballers
Association football midfielders
Northwich Victoria F.C. players
Manchester City F.C. players
Port Vale F.C. players
Colwyn Bay F.C. players
Macclesfield Town F.C. players
Mossley A.F.C. players
English Football League players
1912 births
1973 deaths